Dong Jun (born in 1963) is an admiral (shangjiang) of the People's Liberation Army (PLA) serving as Commander of the People's Liberation Army Navy, succeeding Shen Jinlong in September 2021.

Biography
In 2013, Dong was appointed deputy commander of East Sea Fleet, and held that office until December 2014, when he was appointed deputy chief of staff of the People's Liberation Army Navy. In January 2017, he was promoted to become deputy commander of Southern Theater Command. In March 2021, he became deputy commander of the People's Liberation Army Navy, rising to commander in August 2021.

He was promoted to the rank of rear admiral (shaojiang) in July 2012, vice admiral (zhongjiang) in July 2018 and admiral (shangjiang) in September 2021.

References

Living people
Commanders of the People's Liberation Army Navy
1963 births